Diego Cadavid (born Diego Andrés Cadavid on December 8, 1978 in Medellín, Colombia) is a Colombian actor, cinematographer and musician known for his roles in telenovelas.

He is currently dating Laura Archbold, a fellow Colombian actress who also appeared in the 2021 reboot of Café con aroma de mujer.

Filmography

Film

Television roles

References

External links 

1978 births
21st-century Colombian male actors
Colombian male telenovela actors
Living people
People from Medellín